St Paul's Church is the parish church of Whitley Bay, North Tyneside, United Kingdom.The church was founded in 1864. The church's official title is St Paul's Church, Cullercoats but it is located near the centre of the town rather than the suburb of Cullercoats.

History

The building was designed by Anthony Salvin for the Duke of Northumberland. It is designated by English Heritage as a Grade II listed building.

Present day
The church produces a regular newsletter and parish magazine. It also holds an annual summer fair and the St Nicholas Fair and Festival during the first weekend in Advent.

Ann Laing and Sandra Graham are the churchwardens.

The parish was in the Traditional Catholic tradition, and passed resolutions to reject the ordination of women and so received alternative episcopal oversight from the Bishop of Beverley. It has now rescinded those resolutions and receives episcopal oversight from the Bishop of Newcastle.

Parochial church council

The parochial church council (PCC) oversees the administration, finances and fabric of the church. The 22 member council, which meets monthly, comprises two clergy, one lay reader, two churchwardens, one treasurer, one diocesan synod representative (who attends meetings with others from the Diocese of Newcastle and Tynemouth Deanery), three deanery synod representatives (who attend meetings with others from the Tynemouth Deanery) and 12 lay members. All members except the clergy and lay reader are elected. The standing committee, consisting of five PCC members, deals with any emergency issues arising between meetings and sets agenda for PCC meetings.

Notable clergy
 Norman Banks, later Bishop of Richborough, was the vicar from 1990 until 2000. 
 Paul Bayes, later Bishop of Liverpool, served his curacy at St Paul's from 1979 until 1982.

List of Vicars

Music

The church has a 15-strong choir. A former organist, John Percival Forster, was killed in the Battle of the Somme on 1 July 1916, aged 28. He was organist at St Paul's for six years from 1912 to 1916. A plaque commemorating his life remains to the right of the altar.

See also
List of new churches by Anthony Salvin

References

External links
 St Paul's Bell Ringers
Entry on British listed buildings website

Whitley Bay, St Paul's Church
Grade II listed churches in Tyne and Wear
Whitley Bay
Anthony Salvin buildings
Whitley Bay